Switzerland is a semi-direct democratic federal republic. The federal legislative power is vested in the two chambers of the Federal Assembly: the National Council and the Council of States. The Federal Council holds the executive power and is composed of seven power-sharing Federal Councillors elected by the Federal Assembly. The judicial branch is headed by the Federal Supreme Court of Switzerland, whose judges are elected by the Federal Assembly.

Switzerland has a tradition of direct democracy. For any change in the constitution, a referendum is mandatory (mandatory referendum); for any change in a law, a referendum can be requested (optional referendum). In addition, the people may present a constitutional popular initiative to introduce amendments to the federal constitution. The people also assume a role similar to the constitutional court, which does not exist, and thus act as the guardian of the rule of law.

Cantonal and municipal politics vary in the different cantons, which may have different systems.

Direct representation 

Switzerland features a system of government not seen in any other nation: direct representation, sometimes called half-direct democracy (this may be arguable, because theoretically, the sovereign of Switzerland is actually its entire electorate). Referendums on the most important laws have been used since the 1848 constitution.

Amendments to the Federal Constitution of Switzerland, the joining of international organisations, or changes to federal laws that have no foundation in the constitution but will remain in force for more than one year must be approved by the majority of both the people and the cantons, a double majority.

Any citizen may challenge a law that has been passed by parliament. If that person is able to gather 50,000 signatures against the law within 100 days, a national vote has to be scheduled where voters decide by a simple majority of the voters whether to accept or reject the law.

Furthermore, any citizen may seek a decision on an amendment they want to make to the constitution. For such a federal popular initiative to be organised, the signatures of 100,000 voters must be collected within 18 months. Such a federal popular initiative is formulated as a precise new text (general proposal initiatives have been canceled in 2009) whose wording can no longer be changed by parliament and the government. After a successful signature gathering, the Federal Council may create a counterproposal to the proposed amendment and put it to vote on the same day as the original proposal. Such counterproposals are usually a compromise between the status quo and the wording of the initiative. Voters will decide in a national vote whether to accept the initiative amendment, the counterproposal put forward by the government if any, or both. If both are accepted, one has to additionally signal a preference. Initiatives (that are of constitutional level) have to be accepted by a double majority of both the popular votes and a majority of the cantons, while counter-proposals may be of legislative level and hence require only simple majority.

Federal level 
Federalism refers to a vertical separation of powers. The aim is to avoid the concentration of power in a forum, which allows a moderation of state power and the easing of the duties of the federal state.

In Switzerland, it is above all a matter of designating the independence of the cantons vis-à-vis the Confederation.

Executive branch

The Swiss Federal Council is a seven-member executive council that heads the federal administration, operating as a combination cabinet and collective presidency. Any Swiss citizen eligible to be a member of the National Council can be elected; candidates do not have to register for the election, or to actually be members of the National Council. The Federal Council is elected by the Federal Assembly for a four-year term. Present members are: Guy Parmelin (SVP/UDC), Ignazio Cassis (FDP/PLR), Viola Amherd (DM/LC), Karin Keller-Sutter (FDP/PLR), Albert Rösti (SVP/UDC), and Élisabeth Baume-Schneider (SP/PS).

The largely ceremonial President and Vice President of the Confederation are elected by the Federal Assembly from among the members of the Federal Council for one-year terms that run concurrently. The President has almost no powers over and above his or her six colleagues, but undertakes representative functions normally performed by a president or prime minister in single-executive systems. The current President and Vice President are Alain Berset and Viola Amherd, respectively.

The Swiss executive is one of the most stable governments worldwide. Since 1848, it has never been renewed entirely at the same time, providing a long-term continuity. From 1959 to 2003 the Federal Council was composed of a coalition of all major parties in the same ratio: two each from the (now-defunct) Free Democratic Party, Social Democratic Party and (now-defunct) Christian Democratic People's Party and one from the Swiss People's Party. Changes in the Federal Council occur typically only if one of the members resigns (merely four incumbent members were voted out of the office in over 150 years); this member is almost always replaced by someone from the same party (and often also from the same linguistic group).

The Federal Chancellor is the head of the Federal Chancellery of Switzerland, which acts as the general staff of the Federal Council. The Chancellery is divided into three distinct sectors. The Chancellor, currently Walter Thurnherr, is the formal head of the Federal Chancellor Sector, comprising the planning and strategy section, the Internal Services section, the political rights section, the federal crisis management training unit of the Federal Administration and the Records and Process Management section.

Two sectors are headed by the Vice-Chancellors: the Federal Council sector headed by Viktor Rossi manages the agenda of the Federal Council's meeting. This sector comprises the Section for Federal Council Affairs, the Legal Section, the Official Publications Centre and the Central Language Services. The Information and Communications Sector is led by Vice-Chancellor André Simonazzi; this role also has expanded to become the official spokesman for the Federal Council in 2000. This sector includes the e-Government Section, the Communication Support Section and the Political Forum of the Confederation.

The federal government has been a coalition of the four major political parties since 1959, each party having a number of seats that roughly reflects its share of electorate and representation in the federal parliament. The classic distribution of 2 CVP/PDC, 2 SP/PS, 2 FDP/PRD and 1 SVP/UDC as it stood from 1959 to 2003 was known as the "magic formula".

This "magic formula" has been repeatedly criticised: in the 1960s, for excluding leftist opposition parties; in the 1980s, for excluding the emerging Green Party; and particularly after the 1999 election, by the Swiss People's Party, which had by then grown from being the fourth-largest party in the National Council to being the largest. In the 2003 federal election, the Swiss People's Party received (effective 1 January 2004) a second seat in the Federal Council, reducing the share of the Christian Democratic Party to one seat.

Legislative branch

Switzerland has a bicameral parliament called the Federal Assembly, which is composed by:
 the Council of States (46 seats, 2 seats per canton, except for six cantons which only have 1), also known as the upper chamber
 the National Council (200 seats, split between the cantons based on population), also known as the lower chamber
The Federal Assembly convenes to elect the members of the Federal Council.
The two chambers are equal (perfect bicameralism). This power-sharing system serves to avoid monopolization of federal politics by more populated cantons to the detriment of smaller and rural cantons.

Members of both houses serve for 4 years and only serve as members of parliament part-time (so-called "Milizsystem" or Citizen legislature).

Political parties and elections

Switzerland has a rich party landscape. The four parties represented in the Federal Council are generally called the government parties: The Liberals (FDP/PLR), the Social Democratic Party (SP/PS), The Centre (DM/LC) and the Swiss People's Party (SVP/UDC).

Judicial branch
Switzerland has a Federal Supreme Court, with judges elected for six-year terms by the Federal Assembly. The function of the Federal Supreme Court is to hear appeals of cantonal courts or the administrative rulings of the federal administration.
Switzerland does not have a Constitutional Court, and the Supreme Court cannot comment on law put forward by the parliament. This role is assumed by the people, which acts as a guardian and can repeal any legislation or constitutional change.

Administrative divisions 

There are 26 cantons in Switzerland. Each canton has its own constitution, legislature, government and courts.

In Appenzell Innerrhoden and Glarus citizens assemble each year for the Landsgemeinde (general assembly) to elect the cantonal government and judiciary and to vote on several issues on the agenda (direct democracy)

Executive branch

Legislative branch

Political conditions

Switzerland has a stable government, with democratic power sharing through consociationalism. Most voters support the government in its philosophy of armed neutrality underlying its foreign and defense policies. Domestic policy poses some major problems, to the point that many observers deem that the system is in crisis but the changing international environment has generated a significant reexamination of Swiss policy in key areas such as defense, neutrality, and immigration. Quadrennial national elections typically produce only marginal changes in party representation.

In recent years, Switzerland has seen a gradual shift in the party landscape. The right-wing Swiss People's Party (SVP), traditionally the junior partner in the four-party coalition government, more than doubled its voting share from 11.0% in 1987 to 22.5% in 1999, rising to 28.9% in 2007, thus overtaking its three coalition partners. This shift in voting shares put a strain on the "magic formula", the power-broking agreement of the four coalition parties. From 1959 until 2004, the seven-seat cabinet had comprised 2 Free Democrats, 2 Christian Democrats, 2 Social Democrats, and 1 Swiss People's Party, but in 2004, the Swiss People's Party took one seat from the Christian Democrats. In 2008 the Conservative Democratic Party split from the SVP, taking both of their Federal Council seats with them. However, the SVP eventually retook both seats, in 2009 and 2015 respectively.

The Swiss Federal Constitution limits federal influence in the formulation of domestic policy and emphasizes the roles of private enterprise and cantonal government. However, in more recent times the powers of the Confederation have increased with regard to education, agriculture, health, energy, the environment, organized crime, and narcotics.

 According to Freedom House, an American NGO, Switzerland is among the freest countries in the world, with a 2020 score of 39/40 on political rights and 57/60 on civil liberties (for a combined score of 96/100). Switzerland has a high level of press freedom, ranking 8th internationally (out of 180 countries) in the 2020 Press Freedom Index published by Reporters Without Borders. Additionally, Switzerland is perceived to be among the least politically corrupt nations in the world, ranking 3rd internationally (tied with Sweden and Singapore) in the 2020 Corruption Perceptions Index published by Transparency International.

Foreign relations 

Switzerland has avoided alliances that might entail military, political, or direct economic action. In June 2001, Swiss voters approved new legislation providing for the deployment of armed Swiss troops for international peacekeeping missions under United Nations or Organization for Security and Co-operation in Europe auspices as well as international cooperation in military training. The Swiss have broadened the scope of activities in which they feel able to participate without compromising their neutrality.

Switzerland maintains diplomatic relations with almost all countries and historically has served as a neutral intermediary and host to major international treaty conferences. The country has no major disputes in its bilateral relations.

Energy politics

The energy generated in Switzerland comprises 55.2% hydroelectricity, 39.9% from nuclear power, about 4% from conventional sources and about 1% other.

On 18 May 2003, two referendums regarding the future of nuclear power in Switzerland were held. The referendum Electricity Without Nuclear asked for a decision on a nuclear power phase-out and Moratorium Plus asked about an extension of an existing law forbidding the building of new nuclear power plants. Both were turned down: Moratorium Plus by a margin of 41.6% for and 58.4% opposed, and Electricity Without Nuclear by a margin of 33.7% for and 66.3% opposed. The former ten-year moratorium on the construction of new nuclear power plants was the result of a federal popular initiative voted on in 1990 which had passed with 54.5% Yes vs. 45.5% No votes (see Nuclear power in Switzerland for details).

In May 2011, due to the Fukushima accident in Japan, the Swiss government decided to abandon plans to build new nuclear reactors. The country's five existing reactors will be allowed to continue operating, but will not be replaced at the end of their life span. The last will go offline in 2034.

See also 
Modern history of Switzerland
Demographics of Switzerland
Semidirect democracy
Federal popular initiative
Referendum, List of Swiss federal referendums
Concordance system
Constitutional conventions of Switzerland
Voting in Switzerland

Notes and References

Bibliography
 

 Wolf Linder, Yannis Papadopoulos, Hanspeter Kriesi, Peter Knoepfel, Ulrich Klöti, Pascal Sciarini:
 Handbook of Swiss Politics, Neue Zürcher Zeitung Publishing, 2007, .
 Handbuch der Schweizer Politik / Manuel de la politique suisse, Verlag Neue Zürcher Zeitung, 2007, .
 Vincent Golay and Mix et Remix, Swiss political institutions, Éditions loisirs et pédagogie, 2008. .

External links

 Swiss government site (in English)
 Swiss parliament site (in English)
 Chief of State and Cabinet Members
 Political rights at the federal level
 The political landscape of the present parliament depicted in a graph
 Swiss political system